Finote Selam (Amharic: ፍኖተ ሰላም) is a town and separate woreda in western Ethiopia. Located in the Mirab Gojjam Zone of the Amhara Region, by road 387 km from Addis Ababa and 176 km from Bahir Dar. By air, the distance from Addis Ababa is 246 km. Finote Selam, the "Pacific Road", is the name given by Emperor Haile Silassie during the Italian invasion on Ethiopia. Formerly its name was Wojet. Now Finote Selam is the capital city of West Gojjam Zone.

History
Finote Selam, the "Pacific Road", the name given by Emperor Haile Silassie during the Italian invasion on Ethiopia. Formerly its name was Wojet.

In 1964, a hospital for lepers had been built in Finote Selam by the private fund "Swedish Aid to Leprous Children in Ethiopia". The hospital, Finote Selam Hospital, is a district hospital although it not upgraded to a general hospital. The hospital has a limited resources. In 2019, there was a peaceful demonstration of hospital staff, asking for good governance and that "the hospital shall be general hospital".

Rally against the government 
On August 25, 2016, People of Finote Selam demonstrated against the national government. Regime forces shot and killed a college student in Finote Selam, West Gojam on Thursday as they used lethal force to disperse protesters who took to the streets for the second day to show solidarity with the Amhara and Oromo people who demand an end to TPLF rule.

Demographics 

Based on the 2007 national census conducted by the Central Statistical Agency of Ethiopia (CSA), this town had a total population of 25,913, of whom 13,035 were male and 12,878 female. Most (95.91%) of the inhabitants practice Ethiopian Orthodox Christianity, and 3.34% were Muslim.
The 1994 census reported a total population of 13,834.

Education

Notable schools in Finote Selam include Damot Higher and Secondary School and Damot Preparatory school. Colleges in the town include Finote Selam Teachers College and Finote Damot TVET College are frontier.

Agriculture 

Finote Selam and the neighbouring woredas are known for production of teff, maize, peppers, beans and chickpeas, fruit and vegetables.

Tourism
Hotels in Finote Selam town include Damot Hotel, and Xtrem Hotel.

Notable People
Prominent people from Finote Selam include scientist Segenet Kelemu and artist Yhunie Belay.

Notes 

Populated places in the Amhara Region
Ethiopia
Cities and towns in Ethiopia